The inkspot nudibranch, Ceratosoma ingozi, is a species of colourful sea slug, a dorid nudibranch. It is a marine gastropod mollusc in the family Chromodorididae.

Distribution
This species has so far only been found around the southern African coast from the Cape Peninsula to Port Elizabeth in 15–40 m of water. It is probably endemic.

Description
The inkspot nudibranch is a deep-bodied dorid with a smooth skin and bluish-edged purple spots. It has creamy gills and rhinophores. Its body colour varies from a creamy yellow through pinks to purples. It may reach a total length of 80 mm.

Ecology
This species feeds on sponges. Its egg ribbon is a stiff collar of large yellow-orange eggs.

References

Chromodorididae
Gastropods described in 1996